Vyacheslav Vladimirovich Atavin (born February 4, 1967, in Krasnodar) is a former Soviet and Russian  handball player.

During the Soviet period of his career Atavin trained at Dynamo in Astrakhan. He became the Honoured Master of Sports of the USSR in 1988 and competed for the USSR National Team between 1988 and 1991. In 1988 he won the gold medal with the USSR team at the 1988 Summer Olympics. He played all six matches and scored 23 goals. Since 1992 he competed for Russia.

Atavin graduated from Astrakhan Institute of Fish Industry and Economics in 1990.

References

External links
profile

1967 births
Living people
Soviet male handball players
Honoured Masters of Sport of the USSR
Russian male handball players
Handball players at the 1988 Summer Olympics
Olympic handball players of the Soviet Union
Olympic gold medalists for the Soviet Union
Dynamo sports society athletes
Olympic medalists in handball
Medalists at the 1988 Summer Olympics
BM Granollers players
Sportspeople from Krasnodar